St. James Catholic Church is a Catholic church in Crosstown, Missouri. It is operated as a mission church of the parish of St. Vincent de Paul in Perryville. It is under the jurisdiction of the Ste. Genevieve Deanery of the Archdiocese of St. Louis.

History
The original mission church started in a private home in 1860s. The frame church was begun in 1884 and finished in 1889. The church was restored after the fire of 1926.

References

 

Roman Catholic churches completed in 1889
Churches in the Roman Catholic Archdiocese of St. Louis
Churches in Perry County, Missouri
Crosstown, Missouri
19th-century Roman Catholic church buildings in the United States